Down Here is the second album by American singer-songwriter Tracy Bonham, released on April 18, 2000 through Island Records. The album was recorded between 1997 and 1999, and was initially produced by Bonham, Mitchell Froom and Tchad Blake. Bonham clashed with Island over the album's creative direction, resulting in her writing three more commercial-sounding songs for the album. The album was supposed to be released  October 27, 1998 under the title Trail of a Dust Devil, but was delayed until the spring of 2000, as Island was going through a major restructuring.

Down Here received generally positive reviews from critics. However, the album struggled to find an audience in a musical climate dominated by nu metal, and it experienced virtually no radio airplay. The album and its only single, "Behind Every Good Woman" failed to appear on any sales charts worldwide. Down Here was Bonham's final album for Island.

Reception

Stephen Thomas Erlewine of AllMusic wrote: "Though it occasionally sounds a little out of time -- it's a record that would have made more sense in 1997 than in 2000 -- Down Here is a record that reveals much of its strengths only with repeated listens, and that's part of the problem. Apart from the hardcore fans that have stuck with her for five years, not many people will give it a chance. If they do, they'll find that it's a smart, assured, and distinctive second effort that is a quantum leap past her debut." The New Zealand Herald wrote that the "trouble is perhaps, that for all Bonham's musical craftiness (and her violin-playing which saws through a few tracks) and attitude, she's not that memorable, especially melodically." The Los Angeles Times thought that the album "collects music that is even richer and more distinctive" than the debut.

Track listing

Personnel
Personnel per liner notes.
Tracy Bonham - bass, guitar, violin, Hammond organ, vocals
Gregg Arreguin - guitar
Steve Berlin - baritone saxophone
Mitchell Froom - organ, piano, drum loop, sounds, optigan, Minimoog
Don Gilmore - bass, production
Dan Rothchild - bass
Andrew Sherman - clavinet, Wurlitzer
Steve Slingeneyer - percussion, drums, marimba
Sebastian Steinberg - bass, upright bass
Pete Thomas - drums
Josh Freese - drums

Production
Producers: Tracy Bonham, Tchad Blake, Mitchell Froom, Mark Endert
Engineer: Tchad Blake
Assistants: Doug Boehm, David Bryant, Robert Carranza, Juan Garcia, Evan Hollander, S. "Husky" Hoskulds, James Murray
Mixing: Tchad Blake, Mark Endert, Tom Lord
String arrangements: Tracy Bonham
Pitch adjustment: Tracy Bonham
Design: Ondine Bue, Steve Slingeneyer
Art direction: Ondine Bue, Steve Slingeneyer
Photography: Valerie Phillips, Norman Jean Roy

References

External links

Tracy Bonham albums
2000 albums
Albums produced by Tchad Blake